The Chennai Metropolitan Development Authority (CMDA), formerly known as the Madras Metropolitan Development Authority (MMDA), is the nodal planning agency of Chennai in the Indian state of Tamil Nadu. It was set up for the purposes of planning, co-ordination, supervising, promoting and securing the planned development of the Chennai Metropolitan Area. It coordinates the development activities of the municipal corporations, municipalities and other local authorities.

History 
The CMDA was constituted as an ad hoc body in 1972 under the Tamil Nadu Town and Country Planning Act 1971. It was formed as the nodal Town planning authority for the city of Madras (now Chennai) and its suburbs and became a statutory body in 1974. It is headed by minister for housing as its chairman.

In January 2013, CMDA was recognised as a research centre by the Centre for Research, Anna University.

Jurisdiction 
The CMA falls in five Districts of the Tamil Nadu State viz. Chennai District, Tiruvallur District (except Pallipattu, RK Pet & parts of Tiruttani Taluks), Kancheepuram District (except Uthiramerur Taluk), Chengalpattu District (except Madurantakam & Cheyyur Taluks) & Ranipet District (parts of Arakkonam Taluk). New construction in areas under the CMDA needs their approval to start work.

In Chennai district
Alandur
Ambattur
Aminjikarai
Ayanavaram
Egmore
Guindy
Madhavaram
Maduravoyal
Mambalam
Mylapore
Perambur
Purasawalkam
Sholinganallur
Thiruvottiyur
Tondiarpet
Velachery

In Chengalpattu district
Pallavaram
Tambaram
Vandalur
Chengalpattu
Thiruporur
Tirukalukundram

In Kanchipuram district
Kundrathur
Sriperumbudur
Kanchipuram
Walajabad

In Tiruvallur district
Avadi
Poonamallee
Ponneri
Gummidipoondi
Uthukottai
Tiruvallur
Tiruttani (partial)

In Ranipet district
Arakkonam (partial)

Projects 
Some of the notable projects undertaken by the CMDA include:
 Chennai Mofussil bus terminus, Koyambedu
 Wholesale vegetable market, Koyambedu
 Chennai Mass Rapid Transit System
 Outer Ring Road
Madhavaram Mofussil Bus Terminus, Madhavaram
Kilambakkam Mofussil Bus Terminus, Kilambakkam
Kuthambakkam Mofussil Bus Terminus, Kuthambakkam

References

External links 
CMDA Homepage

Government of Chennai
State urban development authorities of India
Government agencies established in 1974
1974 establishments in Tamil Nadu
Planning authorities in Tamil Nadu